The eighty-first Cabinet of Bulgaria was a caretaker technocratic government set up by President Zhelyu Zhelev following the resignation of the Berov government. The government, headed by Prime Minister Reneta Indzhova, ruled from 17 October 1994 to 25 January 1995 at which time the new cabinet took office.

Formation
The technocratic government led by Lyuben Berov resigned in September 1994. With no party willing to form a new government, the President appointed Indzhova to head a provisional government that would lead the country through the early elections on December 18 of that same year.

Dissolution
Following the victory in the December elections of the Democratic Left, an electoral alliance led by the Bulgarian Socialist Party, the newly elected 37 National Assembly voted in Zhan Videnov and his cabinet. Thus, after ruling for exactly 100 days, the Indzhova government was officially dissolved.

See also  
 History of Bulgaria since 1989

References

Bulgarian governments
1994 establishments in Bulgaria